History of West Australia: A Narrative Of Her Past Together With Biographies Of Her Leading Men is a folio size book of , compiled by  Kimberly over a period of 18 months, and published in 1897.

Due to its age, all of the material in the book is in the public domain and may be freely reproduced.

Description
Kimberly, an American, came to Australia from Chicago in the mid-1880s and edited commemorative histories of the gold mining towns of Ballarat and Bendigo, both published by  Niven & Co. in Melbourne.  In late 1895 he approached Sir John Forrest with a proposal for a similar project if the Government of Western Australia would make a £2000 subsidy grant.  Forrest countered with an offer that the government would guarantee the purchase of 100 of the completed books.  Kimberly accepted and with assistant and Melbourne journalist  Pascoe completed the 340,000 word project in 18 months.

The book consists of two parts: The first (and larger) section up to page 348 deals with the history of Western Australia from the earliest European hypotheses of the country's existence in the 14th century through to May of the year of publication (1897), including extensive detail on European exploration across the state from 1829. Two appendices which are essentially essays, follow and deal mainly with gold and the gold mining industry which was the dominant social and economic factor in the state at the time of publication.

The second section is a volume of 163 biographies of notable Western Australians. Page numbering restarts from 1 through to 236 and typically include several pages of text as well as a large portrait photo for each entry.

History

 CHAPTER I. – The Discovery of Australia
 CHAPTER II. – The Discovery of Australia (Continued)
 CHAPTER III. – The Aborigines
 CHAPTER IV. – Western Australia Annexed
 CHAPTER V. – Foundation of the Colony
 CHAPTER VI. – Perth and Fremantle Founded, and Progress in 1829
 CHAPTER VII. – Incidents and Progress in 1830
 CHAPTER VIII. – Exploration ; Social Condition Abolition of Land Grant System; 1831
 CHAPTER IX. – Famine Prices and Progressive Incidents; 1832
 CHAPTER X. – Native Strife and Progressive Incidents; 1833
 CHAPTER XI. – Condition of Settlement; Agitation and Native Troubles; 1834-5
 CHAPTER XII. – Animation in Pastoral Pursuits; Occurrences from 1836 to 1838
 CHAPTER XIII. – Land Laws; Exploration; Australind Settlement; 1839–42
 CHAPTER XIV. – Depression; Birth of Industries; Convict Agitation; 1843 to 1848
 CHAPTER XV. – A Penal Settlement; 1849 to 1853
 CHAPTER XVI. – The Convict System; 1854 to 1860
 CHAPTER XVII. – Transportation Ceases; North-West; an Election; 1861 to 1868
 CHAPTER XVIII. – Representative Government Exploration; 1869 to 1878
 CHAPTER XIX. – Public Works; Constitutional Agitation; Gold Discoveries; 1879 to 1888
 CHAPTER XX. – Responsible Government; 1889 to 1892.
 CHAPTER XXI. – The Goldfields; 1893 to 1897

Appendix I
 "The Interior Gold Region Of Western Australia" (pp 341–348), by S. Göczel, mining engineer and metallurgist discusses the current science and geographical issues relating to the location and extraction of gold deposits.

Appendix II
 "The Mineral Resources" (pp 349–357), by  Vosper deals with the major goldfield regions as well as mining machinery and mining laws.

Biographies

A
 Alexander, William, M.L.C.

B
 Backhouse, Frank Herbert
 Dr. Barnett, Henry Calvert, J.P., M.R.c.s., L.R.C.P.
 Bellingham, George, J.P., M.I.F.M.E., M.E.
 Captain Bissenberger, Frank
 Briggs, Henry, J.P., M.L.C.
 Brimage, Thomas Frederick
 Broadhurst, Florance C.
 Brookman, William Gordon
 Bush, Robert Edwin, J.P., ex-M.L.C.

C
 Chewings, Dr. Charles, PH. M.E.
 Clare, William Edward
 Cohn, Isidore James Knight, J.P.
 Congdon, Daniel Keen, J.P., M.L.C.
 Connor, Francis, M.L.A.
 Conolly, John Richard Arthur, J.P., M.L.A.
 Craig, Frank, J.P.
 Crossland, Charles, J.P.
 Cumbrae-Stewart, Charles Robert
 Cutbush, Charles

D
 Davies, Edward William, ex-M.L.C.
 Davies, George Alfred, J.P.
 Davies, John
 De Baun, John
 Deeley, Charles Ernest
 Dempster, Charles Edward, J.P., M.L.A.
 Doherty, Dennis Joseph, M.L.C.
 Doolette, Dorham Longford
 Rev. Father Duff, James
 Dunn, John George, F.R.G.S.

E
 Edgar, John, J.P.
 Ewing, Norman Kirkwood, M.L.A.

F
 Fairbairn, Robert, P.M.
 Fearby, George Rowland, M.E.
 Ferguson, John Maxwell
 Fimister, John William
 Finnerty, John Michael, R.M.
 Sir Forrest, John, K.C.M.G., F.R.G.S., F.G.S.

G
 Gale, William Hepburn, J.P.
 The Most Rev. Gibney, Matthew, D.D.
 Glyde, George, J.P., ex M.L.C.
 Göczel, Stephen L., M.E.
 Goodsir, David James Cook, J.P.
 Grant, Mackenzie, J.P.
 Grave, James
 Gregory, Henry, J.P., M.L.A.
 Griffith, William, F.R.G.S., H.G.S., M.F.I.M.E.

H
 Hackett, John Winthrop, M. A., J.P., M.L.C.
 Hair, Robert Lees
 Hall, Lyall, M.L.A.
 Hardwick, Thomas Wall
 Harney, Edward Augustine St. Aubyn
 Harper, Charles, M.L.A.
 Haynes, Richard Septimus, M.L.C.
 Henning, Andrew Harriott, M.L.C.
 Hewer, George
 Hills, John Charles
 Holmes, Joseph John, M.L.A.
 Holmes, William Johnston, J.P.
 Hooley, Edward Timothy, J.P., M.L.A.
 Dr. Hope, James William,. J.P., F.R.C.P.
 Horgan, John
 Humble, George Bland
 Hurst, John, Councillor John

I
 lllingworth, Frederick, M.L.A.

J
 James, John Charles Horsey, B.A. OXON., P.M.
 James, Walter, M.L.A.

K
 Keane, Edward Vivian Harvey, J.P., ex-M.L.A.
 Dr. Kenny, Daniel, L.R.C.S., L.K.Q.C.P.I.
 Kingsmill, Walter, J.P., M.L.A.

L
 Lacey, Edmund Gilyard
 Leake, George, M.L.A.
 Lee, Alfred Frederick, Councillor (Perth)
 Hon. Sir Lee-Steere, James G., K.B.
 Lefroy, Henry Bruce, J.P., M.L.A.
 Hon. Lefroy, Anthony O'Grady, C.M.G.
 Lindsay, David, F.R.G.S., M.S.A.J.S.
 Locke, Ernest Charles Bavage, M.L.A.
 Loton, William Thorley, M.L.A.
 Dr. Lovegrove, Thomas Henry, J.F., M.R.C.S. ENG.
 Lovely, William Harvey Chapman, M.A.I.M.E., M.I.M.M.E.
 Lyon, Charles Gordon, J.P.

M
 Macdonald, Albert Watt, J.P.
 Mackay, Donald McDonald, M.L.C.
 Mackenzie, Alfred
 Mannheim, Ernest Arthur, H.E.
 Hon. Marmion, William Edward, M.L.A.
 Mason, Clayton Turner, J.P., M. INST. C.E.
 Menzie, Leslie Robert
 Mitchell, Samuel, J.P., M.L.A.
 Monger, Frederick Charles, M.L.A.
 Moore, John Fairbourne
 Moore, William Dalgety, ex-M.L.C.
 Moorhead, Frederick William
 Moran, Charles John
 Morgans, Alfred Edward
 Mosey, Frederick
 Moxon, William Ernest
 Mumme, William
 McCormack, Harold B.
 McDonald, John Ernest
 McDonald, John James
 McGillicuddy, Ernest
 McKenzie, Robert Donald
 McKernan, Hugh, M.L.C.
 McLarty, Edward, J.P., M.L.C.
 McWilliams, George Frederick, M. B.

N
 Newman, Thomas

O
 Captain Oates, William [sic], M.L.A.
 Oldham, Charles Henry, M.L.A.
 Captain Owston, William
 O'Connor, Michael, B.A.

P
 Parker, George
 Parker, Stephen Henry, Q.C., M.L.C.
 Parker, Stephen Stanley, J.P., ex-M.L.C.
 Parry, Henry Ernest, J.P.
 Parsons, Harold George
 Paterson, Charles Anthony
 Paterson, William, J.P., ex-M.L.C. and M.L.A.
 Pearce, Thomas Gilbert
 Pennefather, Richard William, B.A., L.L.B., and M.L.A.
 Colonel Phillips, George Braithwaite, J.P.
 Phillips, Samuel J., J.P., M.L.A.
 Hon. Piesse, Frederick Henry, J.P., M.L.A.
 Price, Edward Graham
 Price, Matthew

Q
 Councillor Quinlan, Timothy Francis, J.P., M.L.A.

R
 Randell, George, J.P., M.L.C.
 Reid, John, C.E.
 Hon. Richardson, Alex. Robert, M.L.A.
 Bishop Riley, Charles Owen Leaver, D.D.
 Roe, Augustus Sandford, J.P.
 Roe, James Broun, J P.

S
 Saunders, Henry John, J.P., M.L.C.
 Councillor Saw, Charles Augustus, J.P.
 Scheidel, August, PH. D.
 Schlam S. B., S. B., F.G.S.
 Shaw, James, J.P.
 Shenton, Ernest Chawner
 Sir Shenton, George, K.B., M.L.C.
 Sholl, Edward
 Sholl, Horatio William, M.L.A.
 Sholl, Richard Adolphus, J.P.
 Sholl, Robert Frederick, J.P., M.L.A.
 Short, John Tregterthen
 Simon, Alfred Leon, PH. D.
 Simpson, George Thomas, M.L.A.
 Sinclair, Walter John Lockyer
 Speed, James Montgomery
 Stow, Reginald Marshall

T
 Taylor, John Howard, M.L.C.
 Thomas, John
 Hon. Throssell, George, J.P., M.L.A.
 Dr. Tratman, Frank, J.P., M.D.
 Trigg, Henry Stirling, F.R.I.V.A.

V
 Vanzetti, Eugenio
 Hon. Venn, Harry Whittall, J.P., M.L.A.
 Vosper, F. C. B., M.L.A., M.A.I.M.E.

W
 Wallace, Frank, J.P., M.L.A.
 Dr. Waylen, Alfred Robert, M.D., M.R.C.S. ENG., L.S.A., J.P.
 Williams, Harry
 Councillor Wilson, Frank, (Perth)
 Wilson, John, J.P.
 Hon. Wittenoom, Edward Horne, J.P., M.L.C.
 Woodward, Harry Page, J.P., F.G.S., F.R.G.S., F.I. INST.

Notes

References

Further reading

 Garrick, P. (1984) Two historians and the aborigines: Kimberly and Battye, commentary on their different attitudes. Studies in Western Australian History, No.8 (Dec. 1984), p. 111-130
 Geraldton Advertiser, 30 May 1898, p. 2d – review of book 
 Kimberly, W.B. (1895) Bendigo and vicinity : a comprehensive history of her past, and a resume of her resources ; together with the biographies of her representative pioneers, public, commercial, and professional men, Melbourne: Niven.
 

History of Western Australia
Books about Western Australia
Australian biographical dictionaries
1897 books